Nkrumah "Jah" Thomas (b. 1955, Kingston, Jamaica) is a reggae deejay and record producer who first came to prominence in the 1970s, later setting up his own Midnight Rock and Nura labels.

Biography
Named Nkrumah after Ghanaian nationalist leader Kwame Nkrumah, he adopted the stage name Jah Thomas and began deejaying in the mid-1970s, working with producers such as Alvin Ranglin, who released his single "Midnight Rock", which topped the Jamaican chart in 1976. Thomas's debut album, Stop Yuh Loafin''' gained international recognition via a release on the newly formed Greensleeves Records label. Further deejay albums appeared in the late 1970s, before Thomas began concentrating on producing other artists, that included: Robert Ffrench, Anthony Johnson, Triston Palma, Johnny Osbourne, Michael Palmer, Barry Brown, Barrington Levy, Sugar Minott, Early B, Ranking Toyan, and Robin Hood, at the same time setting up the Midnight Rock record label, one of the most successful performer-owned labels of the period. Midnight Rock soon had a hit record in the shape of Thomas's "Cricket Lovely Cricket". Thomas would often use the mixing talents of Scientist, and the Roots Radics band. He later also set up the Nura label.

He  is the father of reggae singer Da'Ville and singer/producer Dwight Thomas.

DiscographyStop Yuh Loafin' (1978) GreensleevesDance On The Corner (1979) Midnight RockNah Fight Over Woman (1980) Tad'sBlack Ash Dub (1980) Trojan (with The Revolutionaries)Tribute to the Reggae King (1981) Midnight RockDance Hall Connection (1982) Silver CamelDance Hall Stylee (1982) Daddy Kool/Silver CamelShoulder Move (1983) Midnight Rock
 Jah Thomas Meets Scientist In Dub Conference (1996) Munich
 Triston Palmer Meets Jah Thomas In Discostyle (1996) Munich
 Jah Thomas Meets King Tubby Inna Roots Of Dub (1997) Rhino
 Jah Thomas Meets The Roots Radics Dubbing (1999) Trojan
 Jah Thomas meets Barrington Levy inna Dancehall Style Culture Press
 King Tubby's Hidden Treasure(1999) Trojan (Jah Thomas & The Roots Radics)
 Lyrics For Sale Rhino
 Prophecy Of Dub Abraham (Jah Thomas & The Roots Radics)Jah Thomas Meets King Tubby In The House of Dub Majestic ReggaeRoots Dancehall Party (2003) Silver KamelBig Dance A Keep (2005) Silver KamelBig Dance Dub (2005) Silver KamelLiquid Brass (2005) Silver KamelJah Thomas Presents... (2007) Ras Sta ReggaeJah Thomas Meets... (2007) Ras Sta ReggaeJah Thomas Meets...'' (2021) Dub of Dubs

References

External links
Jah Thomas at Roots Archives

1955 births
Living people
People from Manchester Parish
Jamaican reggae musicians
Greensleeves Records artists
Trojan Records artists